Günter Siebert (15 December 1930 – 16 June 2017) was a German footballer who played as a forward.

Playing career

In his second of three spells overall at FC Schalke 04 forward Günter Siebert won the 1958 West German championship with the team.

Later life
After his playing times, he became chairman of Schalke 04 on three occasions. Siebert died in June 2017.

References

External links
 
 

1930 births
2017 deaths
German footballers
FC Schalke 04 players
Association football forwards
Sportspeople from Kassel
Footballers from Hesse